Leandro Montagud Balaguer (born 28 February 1989), known simply as Leandro, is a Spanish footballer who plays as a goalkeeper.

Club career
A product of Elche CF's youth academy, Leandro was born in Alzira, Valencia, and was promoted to the first team for 2009–10 in the Segunda División, acting as third-choice behind Willy Caballero and Jaime as well as still appearing for the reserves. He made his debut for them on 20 March 2010 in a 2–1 home win against Albacete Balompié as the former was sent off, one of only two appearances during the season.

In the following season, Leandro played for Torrellano Illice CF, who at that time acted as the farm team. He featured for the main squad late into the campaign, in a 3–3 draw at Granada CF.

Leandro signed with second-division club SD Ponferradina on 30 July 2012, in a season-long loan. Roughly one year later, he agreed terms with Atlético Levante UD after the expiry of his contract with Elche.

On 10 July 2014, Leandro moved to Cultural y Deportiva Leonesa also of division three. He achieved promotion in 2016–17, but contributed only five matches to the feat (playoffs included).

On 4 July 2017, Leandro signed for CF Villanovense of the third tier. On 6 July of the following year, he agreed to a two-year contract at RCD Mallorca in the level above; he spent the 2018–19 campaign playing second-fiddle to Manolo Reina and Miquel Parera, as the team achieved promotion to La Liga. 

Leandro returned to Cultural in July 2019, on a two-year deal. On 30 September 2020, he joined Orihuela CF.

Honours
Cultural Leonesa
Segunda División B: 2016–17

References

External links

1989 births
Living people
People from Ribera Alta (comarca)
Sportspeople from the Province of Valencia
Spanish footballers
Footballers from the Valencian Community
Association football goalkeepers
Segunda División players
Segunda División B players
Tercera División players
Primera Federación players
Segunda Federación players
Divisiones Regionales de Fútbol players
Elche CF Ilicitano footballers
Elche CF players
SD Ponferradina players
Atlético Levante UD players
Cultural Leonesa footballers
CF Villanovense players
RCD Mallorca players
Orihuela CF players